Leontia "Liliana" Sălăgeanu (born 24 March 1971) is a Romanian middle-distance runner. She competed in the women's 800 metres at the 1992 Summer Olympics.

References

External links
 

1971 births
Living people
Athletes (track and field) at the 1992 Summer Olympics
Romanian female middle-distance runners
Olympic athletes of Romania
Place of birth missing (living people)